A static synchronous series compensator (SSSC) is a type of flexible AC transmission system which consists of a solid-state voltage source inverter coupled with a transformer that is connected in series with a transmission line. This device can inject an almost sinusoidal voltage in series with the line. This injected voltage could be considered as an inductive or capacitive reactance, which is connected in series with the transmission line. This feature can provide controllable voltage compensation. In addition, SSSC is able to reverse the power flow by injecting a sufficiently large series reactive compensating voltage.

See also
 Active power filter
 Static synchronous compensator (STATCOM), a similar shunt-connected device
 Unified power flow controller, a combination of SSSC and STATCOM
 Dynamic voltage restoration

References

Electric power transmission
Power engineering
Power electronics